PortableApps.com is a website offering free applications for Windows  that have been specially packaged for portability. These portable applications are intended to be used from removable media such as USB flash drives. User data is stored in a subfolder, allowing the user to upgrade or move the software without affecting the data. To remove the software, a user can simply delete the main folder.

The site was founded by John T. Haller and includes contributions from over 100 people, including developers, designers and translators.

History
The project started out as a portable version of Mozilla Firefox in March 2004. John T. Haller then expanded the project to include Mozilla Thunderbird and OpenOffice.org. The open-source group of portable programs outgrew Haller's personal website and he moved it to a community site, PortableApps.com. The site currently hosts various projects created by forum members. The site is also used for bug reporting and suggestions.
Some PortableApps distributions are hosted on SourceForge.

Format
Application installers designed for use with the PortableApps.com menu follow the convention of using filenames ending in a  extension, include HTML documentation and store data in the Data directory. Installers intended for use with the PortableApps.com menu can be either NSIS installers, generated with the PortableApps.com Installer, or compressed archives with self extractors. They can also be a custom Windows executable.

Many apps will also run under Wine on Unix-like operating systems. Older versions of many apps support Windows 95/98/Me, but no new releases support these systems.

PortableApps.com Launcher
The PortableApps.com Launcher (also known as PAL) is used to make applications portable by handling path redirection, environment variable changes, file and directory movement, configuration file path updates and similar changes, as configured. The PortableApps.com Launcher allows software to be made portable without the need to write custom code or make changes to the base application. While some of the software packages released on PortableApps.com currently still contain their own custom launchers, the PortableApps.com Launcher is used in all new apps released. The installers are made with Nullsoft Scriptable Install System.

See also
 Comparison of application launchers
 List of portable software
 Portable application
 Portable application creators

References

External links
 

Computing websites
Free software distributions
Portable software
Application launchers
Portable software suites